The Road Traffic Act 1930 was an Act of the Parliament of the United Kingdom introduced by the Minister of Transport Herbert Morrison.

Context
The last major legislation on road traffic was the Motor Car Act 1903. Amendments had been discussed in 1905, 1911, 1913 and 1914 as the Motor Car Act (1903) Amendment Bill and Motor Car Act (1903) Amendment (No 2) Bill. Since 1926 in which there were 4,886 fatalities in some 124,000 crashes a detailed set of national statistics (now known as Road Casualties Great Britain) had been collected. It was not until 1929 that a new Road Traffic Bill was discussed in detail following a Royal Commission report on Transport, "The control of traffic on roads," which was adopted almost in its entirety. During a parliamentary debate on making speedometers compulsory in 1932 it was suggested that speed limits for cars were removed by this Act because "the existing speed limit was so universally disobeyed that its maintenance brought the law into contempt" rather that for considerations of safety.

Clauses
The Act repealed the Locomotives Act 1865, the Locomotives on Highways Act 1896 and the Motor Car Act 1903 and introduced many new regulations which controversially included the removal of all speed limits on UK roads for motor cars.

Relating to motor cars
Abolition of all speed limits for cars
Introduction of driving offences of dangerous, reckless and careless driving and driving whilst being unfit and under the influence of drink or drugs
Compulsory third-party insurance
The first UK driving tests for disabled drivers only
Classification of motor vehicles
Construction, weight and equipment of motor vehicles
Issue of Highway Code

For public service vehicles
Central regulation of UK coach services
Introduction of a 30-mile an hour speed limit for buses and coaches.
Issue of public service vehicles
Rules regarding the conduct of drivers, conductors and passengers on public service vehicles.
Limitation of hours of continuous driving

It was amended in 1988 and at other times.

Third Parties (Rights against Insurers) Act 1930
The Road Traffic Act 1930 was strengthened by the Third Parties (Rights against Insurers) Act 1930.

Legacy
Many clauses introduced by the Act have been retained. Regulations relating to insurance, licensing and driving offences have continued to evolve since that date.

See also
Hill v Baxter
Locomotives on Highways Act 1896
Motor Car Act 1903
Roads Act 1920
Road Traffic Act 1934
Traffic in Towns (1963)
Road Traffic Act 1988
Road Casualties Great Britain
Road speed limits in the United Kingdom

References

Further reading
The control of traffic on roads. (Royal Commission on Transport 1929)
The licensing and regulation of public service vehicles(Royal Commission on Transport 1929)
Royal Commission on Transport - Final report
Debate in the House of Lords - December 1929
Debate in the House of Lords - January 1930

UK Legislation 

Automotive safety
Roads in the United Kingdom
United Kingdom Acts of Parliament 1930
1930 in transport
Transport policy in the United Kingdom
History of transport in the United Kingdom
Transport legislation